Dimitar Iliev Popov (Pokriva) (26 June 1927 – 5 December 2015) was a leading Bulgarian judge and the first Prime Minister of the country not to be a member of the Bulgarian Communist Party since 1946. He was also the first Prime Minister since 1944 who was not a Communist or a fellow traveler.

Popov, who did not have any party affiliation and was chosen for his perceived impartiality as a member of the judiciary, was selected to head the new government after the resignation of Andrey Lukanov in December 1990 in the face of mass demonstrations and a general strike. As Prime Minister, Popov oversaw the drafting of the new constitution as well as the second open elections. Although overseeing the beginnings of the policy of privatization, Popov's government was more of a caretaker administration.

Popov died at the age of 88 on December 5, 2015.

References

 

1927 births
2015 deaths
People from Kula, Bulgaria
Prime Ministers of Bulgaria
Bulgarian judges
Judiciary of Bulgaria